ReQuest Dance Crew (also known as ReQuest) are an all-female hip-hop dance crew from Auckland, New Zealand. ReQuest was formed in 2007, with originally five members. They are based out of The Palace Dance Studio in Penrose and are one of six crews alongside The Royal Family (MegaCrew), Kingsmen (Adult), Sorority (Varsity), Duchesses (Varsity) and Bubblegum (Junior).

Competitions
In 2009, ReQuest competed for the first time at the HHI World Hip Hop Dance Championships in Las Vegas, winning first place in the Varsity Crews division. The following year ReQuest moved into the Adult Crews division where they again placed first, ahead of American crew Poreotics who had won season 5 of America's Best Dance Crew earlier that year. In 2011 they won second place at the World Championships, behind Plague from the United Kingdom. Within the larger The Royal Family megacrew, they have won three gold medals (2011, 2012, 2013) and one silver medal (2015) and 2016 Royal Family Varsity bronze medal at the World Hip Hop Dance Championships in the Megacrew division.

Outside of the World Championships, ReQuest placed first at the 2009 World Supremacy Battlegrounds (Varsity division) in Melbourne, and were crowned the champions of the 2012 Body Rock Dance Competition in San Diego.

Television and live shows
In 2011, ReQuest successfully auditioned for season 6 of America's Best Dance Crew. They were the second international dance crew to be featured on the American show (after Blueprint Cru from Montreal, Canada in 2010), and the first crew from outside North America. ReQuest was eliminated in Week 4 of the competition.

In 2012, group leader Parris Goebel was hired as a choreographer for Jennifer Lopez's Dance Again World Tour. ReQuest also performed with Lopez on the season 11 finale of American Idol, and featured in the music video for her single, "Goin' In". As a result of a meeting with international casting director Jamie King, who was working with Jennifer Lopez at the time, six members of ReQuest were contracted for Cirque du Soleil's Michael Jackson: One, based in Las Vegas. Goebel herself was also contracted to serve as one of the choreographers for the show. Goebel was featured during season 15 of the US version of Dancing with the Stars, performing on stage with several dancers from ReQuest and Royal Family. Parris also goes on tour called "Skulls and Crowns" with some lucky dancers from The Palace.

In 2015, ReQuest were involved in an On-Demand television series on Māori Television called The Palace, which gave insights into the training and daily lives of the dancers at The Palace Dance Studios. In November that year, several dancers from ReQuest appeared onstage at the 2015 American Music Awards during Jennifer Lopez's opening medley performance. The following month, dancers from ReQuest and the Royal Family appeared at the 2015 Mnet Asian Music Awards, dancing on-stage for K-pop acts CL, 2NE1 and Big Bang. 
ReQuest dance crew were a part of Parri$ Goebel's music videos "Friday" and "Nasty." They later went on to perform at her live show in Las Vegas, August 2016.
Members of ReQuest dance crew also appeared on stage with Rihanna at the Video Music Awards of 2016 for one out of three stage performances.

Music videos

Lead choreographer Parris Goebel also appeared in Big Bang's music video "Bang Bang Bang", which she also choreographed with fellow Royal Family choreographer Kiel Tutin.

References

External links
 The Palace Dance Studio website
 

New Zealand dance music groups
New Zealand hip hop groups
America's Best Dance Crew contestants